Radio Nova may refer to:

 Radio Nova (Sofia), 101.7 FM Sofia, Bulgaria
 Radio Nova (Finland)
 Radio Nova (France)
 Radio Nova (Ireland), a pirate radio station operated in 80s
 Radio Nova 100FM (Ireland), a classic rock and roll station licensed for 100.3 FM in Dublin
 Radio Nova (Norway), 99.3 FM Oslo
 Rádio Nova (Portugal), a radio station where Luís Miguel Loureiro started his career

See also
Nova (radio network), a network of radio stations in Australia
 Nova 96.9 (2SYD), Sydney
 Nova 100 (3MEL), Melbourne
 Nova 106.9 (4BNE), Brisbane
 Nova 91.9 (5ADL), Adelaide
 Nova 93.7 (6PER), Perth
 Nova M Radio, an American radio network
 NovaSport FM, a Greek sports radio station featuring music by Christos Dantis
Radio (disambiguation)
Nova (disambiguation)
 Radio Nova International (www.RadioNOVAinternational.co) Belfast, an online tribute to Dublin's original super pirate 1981-86, launched 2021